People of the City is the debut novel of Cyprian Ekwensi first published in 1954 by Andrew Dakers Ltd. The novel was a predecessor to a number of other city novels in the Nigerian tradition.

Development 
Ekwensi began writing the novel while studying pharmacy on scholarship at the University of London. The novel, originated as a series of stories broadcast on the radio, for West Africans living in Britain after World War II.

Critic Chidi Okonkwo, says that the primary influences for Ekwenksi when developing the novel and his writing style, included "Westerns, detective thrillers, oriental tales like Arabian Nights", "European-hero-in-Africa" tales, like those of H. Rider Haggard, adventure tales like Robert Louis Stevenson's, and Indian films." Okonkwo describes these influences as obscuring Ekwensi's earlier experience translating African indigenous stories into English.

Style 
The novel has a didactic tone.

Themes 
The novel challenges European colonial dominance in Africa.

Literary criticism 
Early reception of the novel was generally positive, focusing on the urban setting.

References 

1954 Nigerian novels
Novels by Cyprian Ekwensi
African Writers Series
1954 debut novels
Novels set in Nigeria